Bulinus nasutus is a species of tropical freshwater snail with a sinistral shell, an aquatic gastropod mollusk in the family Planorbidae, the ramshorn snails and their allies.

Subspecies 
 Bulinus nasutus nasutus
 Bulinus nasutus productus Mandahl-Barth, 1960

Distribution
The distribution of Bulinus nasutus includes three countries in East Africa:
 Kenya
 Tanzania including Zanzibar and Pemba Island
 Uganda

Type locality is Bagamoyo, now in Tanzania.

Description 
The width of the shell is 12 mm. The height of the shell is 25 mm.

The diploid chromosome number is 2n = 36.

Ecology 
Bulinus nasutus lives in temporary pools, ditches and burrow-pits.

High concentration of chloride (468-2220 ppm Cl) have been found in pools inhabited by Bulinus nasutus in Tanzania.

Bulinus nasutus can aestivate in the dry mud for about 5–8 months. Respiration of Bulinus nasutus during aestivation is probably aerobic. They aestivate on margins of pools, and thus stop aestivation only in optimal conditions, when the pool has much water.

Webbe (1962, 1965) described population dynamics of Bulinus nasutus in Tanzania.

Mature snails lay eggs during the whole life span, primarily immediately after the main rainfall. Snails 8 weeks old, whose shell is about 8 mm in height, are mature and can lay eggs. However they require more than 12 months of life and 1-2 aestivation periods in order to reach their full size.

This species is an intermediate host for:
 Schistosoma bovis
 Schistosoma haematobium - it is the main intermediate host of Schistosoma haematobium in northwestern Tanzania 
 Echinostome spp.

References

External links 
 Coles G. C. (1969). "Observations on weight loss and oxygen uptake of aestivating Bulinus nasutus, an intermediate host of Schistosoma haematobium". Annals of Tropical Medicine and Parasitology 63: 393-398.
 Harris R. A., Preston T. M. & Southgate V. R. (1993). "Purification of an agglutinin from the haemolymph of the snails Bulinus nasutus and demonstration of related proteins in other Bulinus spp." Parasitology 106: 127-136.
 Matovu D. S. & Nditi H. P. (1978). "Laboratory experiments on the effect of aestivation on oviposition in Bulinus (Physopsis) nasutus". Proceedings of the International Congress on Schistosomiasis, Cairo, Egypt, 1975: 515-519. Cairo: Ministry of Health.
 McClelland W. F. (1965). "Development of S. haematobium in Bulinus (P.) nasutus. Reports of the East African Institute for Medical Research  1963–64: 15.
 Pringle G., Otieno L. H. & Chimtawi M. B. (1971). "Notes on the morphology, susceptibility to S. haematobium and genetic relationships of Bulinus (P.) globosus and B. (P.) nasutus from north-eastern Tanzania". Annals of Tropical Medicine and Parasitology 65: 211-219.
 Stothard J. R. & Rollinson D. (1997). "Partial DNA sequences from the mitochondrial cytochrome oxidase subunit I (COI) gene can differentiate the intermediate snail hosts Bulinus globosus and B. nasutus (Gastropoda: Planorbidae)". Journal of Natural History 31(5): 727-737. .
 Sturrock B. M. (1967). "The effect of infection with Schistosoma haematobium on the growth and reproduction rates of Bulinus (P.) nasutus productus. Annals of Tropical Medicine and Parasitology 61: 321-325.
 Sturrock B. M. (1968). "Resistance of B. (P.) nasutus productus to infection by S. haematobium". Annals of Tropical Medicine and Parasitology'' 62: 393-397.

Bulinus
Gastropods described in 1879